WFKY (104.9 FM) is a radio station broadcasting a country music format. Licensed to Frankfort, Kentucky, the station serves the Lexington metropolitan area.  The station is owned by CapCity Communications.

WFKY was the longtime call sign of what is now WKYW 1490 AM.

References

External links

FKY
Radio stations established in 1967
1967 establishments in Kentucky